This list of museums in Buckinghamshire, England contains museums which are defined for this context as institutions (including nonprofit organizations, government entities, and private businesses) that collect and care for objects of cultural, artistic, scientific, or historical interest and make their collections or related exhibits available for public viewing. Also included are non-profit art galleries and university art galleries.  Museums that exist only in cyberspace (i.e., virtual museums) are not included.

See also
 :Category:Tourist attractions in Buckinghamshire

References

 Visit Britain: Museums and Galleries in Buckinghamshire 
 Visit Buckinghamshire

 
Buckinghamshire
Museums